is a railway station in Moriyama-ku, Nagoya, Aichi Prefecture,  Japan, operated by Meitetsu.

Lines

Station layout
The station has one side platform and one island platform with the island platform on a passing loop. The station has automated ticket machines, Manaca automated turnstiles and is unattended..

Platforms

Adjacent stations

|-
!colspan=5|Nagoya Railroad

Station history
Kitayama Station was opened on July 1, 1927 on the privately operated Seto Electric Railway. The Seto Electric Railway was absorbed into the Meitetsu group on September 1, 1939. A new station building was completed in March 1964. From 1946 to 2007, Kitayama Station was also the inspection yard for trains on the Seto Line.

Passenger statistics
In fiscal 2017, the station was used by an average of 3207 passengers daily.

Surrounding area
 Moriyama Higashi Junior High School

See also
 List of Railway Stations in Japan

References

External links

 Official web page 

Railway stations in Japan opened in 1927
Railway stations in Aichi Prefecture
Stations of Nagoya Railroad
Railway stations in Nagoya